Sólet is a traditional Hungarian-Jewish stew made with kidney beans, barley, onions, paprika, and usually meat. While traditionally a Jewish food, prepared on Fridays before Shabbat and eaten the following day for lunch, it is also commonly eaten by non-Jewish Hungarians, who may even add pork.

Sólet is a variant of Cholent, the traditional Jewish Shabbat dish. It was likely modified by the Magyars living in Pannonia when the Jews arrived and introduced it to them.

See also
 List of stews

References

Ashkenazi Jewish cuisine
Hungarian stews
Jews and Judaism in Hungary